The 2021 Birmingham Bowl was a college football bowl game played on December 28, 2021, with kickoff at 12:00 p.m. EST (11:00 a.m. local CST) and televised on ESPN. It was the 15th edition of the Birmingham Bowl (after the 2020 edition was cancelled due to the COVID-19 pandemic), and was one of the 2021–22 bowl games concluding the 2021 FBS football season. Sponsored by the TicketSmarter ticket sales company, the game was officially known as the TicketSmarter Birmingham Bowl. This was the first edition of the bowl played at Protective Stadium.

Teams
Consistent with conference tie-ins, the bowl features teams from the American Athletic Conference (AAC or "The American") and the Southeastern Conference (SEC).

This was the seventh meeting between Auburn and Houston; previous to the game, the Tigers led the all-time series, 5–1.

Auburn Tigers

Houston Cougars

Game summary

Statistics
Team statistics
Individual statistics

Notes

References

Externals links
Game statistics at statbroadcast.com

Birmingham Bowl
Birmingham Bowl
Auburn Tigers football bowl games
Houston Cougars football bowl games
Birmingham Bowl
Birmingham Bowl